Lidio G. Rainaldi (March 12, 1929 – December 21, 2019) was a Democratic member of the New Mexico Senate.  He represented the 4th District from 2001 to 2008. He died on December 21, 2019, aged 90.

References 

 Senator Lidio G. Rainaldi - (D) at New Mexico Legislature
 Lidio Rainaldi at Project Vote Smart
 Follow the Money – Lidio G Rainaldi
 2006 2004 2000 campaign contributions

1929 births
2019 deaths
People from Gallup, New Mexico
Democratic Party New Mexico state senators